Anza, Anzah, or de Anza might refer to:

Communities

United States
 Anza, California, a town in Riverside County, California
 Anza, Imperial County, California, a town in Imperial County, California, along California State Route 111
 Camp Anza, a defunct Army installation in Riverside, California

Other communities
 Anzá, a town in Antioquia department, Colombia
 Anza, a neighborhood of Agadir, Morocco
 Anzah, a Palestinian village in the West Bank

Landforms and parks
 Anza (river), a river in Piedmont, Italy
 Anza trough, in Kenya
 Anza Valley, in Riverside County, California
 Anza-Borrego Desert State Park, in Southern California
 Lake Anza, a recreational swimming reservoir in the Berkeley Hills, California

People
 Anza (singer) (born 1976), Japanese singer and actress
 Juan Bautista de Anza (1736–1788), colonial Spanish explorer and governor of New Mexico
 Juan Bautista de Anza I (1693–1740), Spanish explorer and father of Juan Bautista de Anza
 Murad Abu Anza (born 1986), Arab-Israeli footballer
 Mauricio Rodriguez Anza (born 1957), Mexican architect and designer
 Santo Anzà (born 1980), Italian cyclist

Schools
 Anza Trail School, an elementary school in the Sahuarita Unified School District of Arizona
 Anza Elementary School, an elementary school in the Torrance Unified School District of Torrance, California
 De Anza College, a community college in Cupertino, California
 De Anza High School, in Richmond, California

Other uses
 Anza (missile), a Pakistani-built surface-to-air missile
 Anza (tribe), an Arab tribe
 2061 Anza, an asteroid
 De Anza Motor Lodge, on Route 66 in Albuquerque, New Mexico
 De Anza League, a sports league in San Bernardino County, California
 De Anza Theatre, a building in Riverside, California
 Joseph Anza, a character in the animated series Fillmore!
 OCA-Anza, an observatory in Orange County, California (see List of observatory codes)
 Agura or Anza, a Japanese term for sitting cross-legged
 Juan de Anza House, in San Juan Bautista, California

See also
 
 
 
 Ansa (disambiguation)
 Ansah (disambiguation)